Stenerud is a Norwegian surname. Notable people with the surname include:

Alexander Stenerud (born 1975), Norwegian singer-songwriter
Harald Stenerud (1897–1976), Norwegian hammer and discus thrower
Jan Stenerud (born 1942), American footballer

Norwegian-language surnames